The Flumini Mannu is a river in southern Sardinia, Italy.

Its springs are located in the hills east of Sardara. The river's main tributaries are the Riu Bellu and the Rio Sitzerri, which for most of the basin of Monte Linas massif's waters.

Rivers of Italy
Rivers of Sardinia
Rivers of the Province of Cagliari
Rivers of the Province of South Sardinia
Drainage basins of the Tyrrhenian Sea